Sir Robert John Rolston Harcourt, JP (1902 – 25 August 1969) was a Northern Irish politician.

Robert Harcourt, known as John, became the director of F. E. Harcourt and Company coal merchants. He was High Sheriff of Belfast in 1949, and later in the year unsuccessfully stood as the Ulster Unionist Party (UUP) candidate for South Down. Soon after this, John William Nixon, the independent Unionist MP for Belfast Woodvale, died. Harcourt stood in the ensuing by-election on 4 April 1950 and was elected.

In 1955, Harcourt was elected Lord Mayor of Belfast, a position which carried with it an ex officio position in the Senate of Northern Ireland. He served until 1957, when he was knighted.

Harcourt was an active member of the Orange Order and a Member of the prestigious Belfast lodge, Royal York LOL 145.

References

External links
 
Belfast City Govt – Former Lords Mayor

1902 births
1969 deaths
High Sheriffs of Belfast
Knights Bachelor
Lord Mayors of Belfast
Members of the House of Commons of Northern Ireland 1949–1953
Members of the House of Commons of Northern Ireland 1953–1958
Members of the Senate of Northern Ireland 1953–1957
Ulster Unionist Party members of the House of Commons of Northern Ireland
Members of the House of Commons of Northern Ireland for Belfast constituencies
Ulster Unionist Party members of the Senate of Northern Ireland
Ulster Unionist Party councillors